Midland News Association (also known as MNA Media) is Britain’s largest independent regional news company. It publishes the UK's biggest-selling regional daily newspaper the Express & Star and its sister title the Shropshire Star, as well as 16 weekly titles and the monthly Shropshire Magazine.

The MNA has one of the fastest growing web networks in the regional press, with 1.3 million average monthly unique users to its sites expressandstar.com and shropshirestar.com – up 33.8 per cent year on year. iPad and iPhone apps for Express & Star and Shropshire Star were launched in January 2012, with further apps for Android and Kindle Fire scheduled for release in January 2013.

Midland News Association is part of the Claverley Group, which also owns the daily newspapers in the Channel Islands, the Jersey Evening Post and Guernsey Press and Star. The company's head office is in Queen Street, Wolverhampton.

Publishing
Daily Newspapers
Express & Star
Shropshire StarWeekly Newspapers
 Bridgnorth Journal
 Cannock Chronicle
 Dudley Chronicle
 Halesowen Chronicle
 Market Drayton Advertiser
 Mid Wales Journal
 Newport Advertiser
 Sandwell Chronicle

 South Shropshire Journal
 Stourbridge Chronicle
 Telford Journal
 Walsall Chronicle
 Shrewsbury Chronicle
 Wolverhampton Chronicle
Magazines
 Shropshire Magazine

As of 2020, editions of the weekly newspapers are delivered free to subscribers of the online page turning edition of the Shropshire Star or Express & Star'. Previously, many weekly papers were delivered to every home.

History

The history of the MNA can be traced back more than 130 years to a partnership between two men, including an ancestor of the Graham family who still own the newspapers today.

Scottish-American millionaire Andrew Carnegie founded the Express & Star in Wolverhampton in the 1880s along with a group of radical Liberal Party members, including Thomas Graham.

Carnegie’s aim was to campaign, through a string of regional daily newspapers, for the creation of a British Republic. His dream was to sack the monarchy, scrap the House of Lords and destroy every vestige of privilege in the land.

By 1902 Carnegie had abandoned his mission and the newspaper has been owned by the Graham family ever since.

Early growth

At least 28 newspapers have been published in Wolverhampton over the past century but the Express & Star remains the market leader.

Among those to be seen off were the Evening News, which closed in July 1915. During the First World War, the Express & Star raised its price to a penny due to the price of paper, with a promise to revert to a halfpenny when hostilities ended.
By 1918, it had a staff of 100, including one delivery van and one driver.

The Graham family took a wider view of the newspaper industry, with Malcolm Graham – the current owner's late father – spending part of his twenties on newspapers in Canada, where he learnt from the slick "New World" style of journalism.

On his return, he applied to the Express & Star the more modern approach he had seen first hand.

By the 1930s, the circulation was more than 100,000 and the paper was part of a newspaper war which saw readers offered all manners of inducement to boost sales, such as tea-sets and holiday tokens.

During the Second World War, newsprint restrictions meant the size of the paper was reduced by half. In response to the shortage, the design moved from broadsheet to tabloid. A comforts fund organised by the paper raised £160,000 over the course of the war, while the paper also became the first to sponsor a Spitfire collection fund.

1950s to 1970s

The post-war period saw the company compete with new innovations such as television yet still push up sales by an average of 1,120 a year.

Despite a national print dispute in 1959, the circulation rose to 201,594 copies a day.

Until 1963, the MNA published the Express & Star, Wolverhampton Chronicle plus the Saturday football paper, all set in a conventional hot metal composing room and printed on five letterpress machines.

In 1964, plans were made to hive off 19,000 copies of the Salop edition to create the Shropshire Star, published at a new photo-composed offset printing plant in Ketley.

The board saw an opportunity with the growth of Dawley New Town – later renamed Telford –  and produced a successful news and advertising product to serve a county which is a mixture of agriculture and industrial areas.

Serving the largest inland county in the UK, both Shropshire Star and Shropshire Weekly Series cover all the major population centres within the circulation area.

Innovation continued during the 1970s, with the MNA introducing the first VDU system and adopting computerised accounting, as well as facsimile transmission.

1980s to present day

In the 1980s the MNA paved the way for the computer revolution in the British newspaper industry and has remained in the forefront of publishing technology.

The Express & Star is firmly established the biggest-selling regional evening newspaper in Britain, while the Shropshire Star remains the fifth biggest, comfortably outselling metropolitan titles like the Birmingham Mail.

The MNA continues to provide same-day news, with local editions for many communities.

With innovations in areas such as iPad Apps and digital newspaper technology, it continues to be at the forefront of regional news more than 130 years after the Carnegie-Graham partnership.

In December 2012 Midland News Association also launched its own recruitment agency, Star Employment Services, which operates from MNA’s headquarters in Queen Street, Wolverhampton.

MNA Digital
MNA Digital is the online branch of Midland News Association, being responsible for developing the websites expressandstar.com and shropshirestar.com and associated newspaper apps for iPad, iPhone, Android and Kindle Fire.

2016 saw a change in the service offering delivered by MNA Digital and the creation of a search marketing agency H1. H1 offers PPC (Paid Search) and SEO services to advertisers outside of MNA's traditional footprint, including fulfilling resold services to other publishers and marketing agencies.

See alsoShrewsbury ChronicleNorth Shropshire Chronicle''

References

External links
expressandstar.com
shropshirestar.com

The MNA on www.linkedin.com
MNA Digital
H1 on Twitter
MNA Digital twitter
https://h1search.com/

Mass media in the West Midlands (region)
Mass media in Wolverhampton
Mass media in Shropshire